The New Zealand budget for fiscal year 2015/16 was presented to the New Zealand House of Representatives by Finance Minister Bill English on 21 May 2015. It was the seventh budget English presented as Minister of Finance.

In response to the budget, Leader of the Opposition Andrew Little called it a "fiddle-it-round budget, a fudge-it budget", while New Zealand First leader Winston Peters called it a "Split Enz budget – I see red, I see red, I see red".

References

External links
 New Zealand Treasury - Budget 2015
 New Zealand Herald - Budget 2015

Budget, 2015
New Zealand budgets
New Zealand budget
May 2015 events in New Zealand